The Latin title Rex Catholicissimus, Anglicized as Most Catholic King or Most Catholic Majesty, was awarded by the Pope to the Sovereigns of Spain.  It was first used by Pope Alexander VI in the papal bull Inter caetera in 1493.

The best-known example of this title is the Catholic Monarchs (Los Reyes Católicos), used solely in reference to Isabella I of Castile and Ferdinand II of Aragon.

Neither King Juan Carlos I nor Felipe VI have made use of the title, but they have not renounced it either.

Similar titles
The monarchs of other countries have received similar titles from the pope:
 Hungary: Apostolic Majesty (Awarded about 1000.)
 France: Most Christian Majesty (Awarded about 1380.)
 England: Defender of the Faith (Awarded in 1521. Revoked about 1530. Continued to be used by the British Monarch.)
 Portugal: Most Faithful Majesty (Awarded 1748.)
Holy Roman Empire: Holy Roman Emperor (Originally awarded as Imperator Romanorum; "Holy" was added in the 13th century) and Defensor Ecclesiae (Protector of the Church, awarded to the Holy Roman Emperor).

Royal styles
Spanish monarchs
Superlatives in religion